Ramender is a name of Indian origin. Also spelt Ramendra or Raminder, this name in Hindi or Sanskrit is composed of two words, Rama and Indra (or Inder).

List of persons with the given name
 Ramendra Sundar Tribedi, Indian (Bengali) author
 Raminder Gill, Canadian politician

Given names